Walter Maslow (born January 16, 1928) is an American film, stage and television actor.

Life and career 
Maslow was born in Brooklyn, New York on January 16, 1928. After high school, he served for two years in the United States Navy, performing and directing while serving. After his discharge. Maslow performed at the Gellar Playhouse in Los Angeles, California, and at Mount Gretna Playhouse in Mount Gretna, Pennsylvania.

Maslow began his film and television career in 1956, first appearing in the adventure and drama television series Crusader. He guest-starred in television programs including Johnny Staccato, 26 Men, Man with a Camera, Colt .45, Tales of Wells Fargo, Sky King, The Man from U.N.C.L.E., Fury, Iron Horse and Highway Patrol. In 1958, Maslow played Pvt. Marty Green in the film Suicide Battalion. In the same year, he played Dick Averill for three episodes in the western television series The Life and Legend of Wyatt Earp, also playing Blackie Saunders in two episodes.

Maslow played Dr. Richie in the 1959 film The Cosmic Man, and Joe in the film Here Come the Jets. He also played Garnis in the 1961 film Atlas.

References

External links 

Rotten Tomatoes profile

1928 births
Living people
20th-century American male actors
American male film actors
American male stage actors
American male television actors
Male actors from New York (state)
People from Brooklyn
Western (genre) television actors